The 1886 Williams Ephs football team represented the Williams College during the 1886 college football season. The team compiled a record of 5–1–1.

Schedule

References

Williams
Williams Ephs football seasons
Williams Ephs football